Putnam Park is a  state natural area owned by the University of Wisconsin–Eau Claire. The park is located in the middle of the city of Eau Claire and follows the course of both the Chippewa River to the west and Minnie Creek to the east. Much of the park lies on the boundary of the Third Ward neighborhood.  The park sits directly south of a steep section of Harding Avenue, once called "Plank Street Hill."

The park is administered by Putnam Park Commission, a body composed of representatives from the University of Wisconsin–Eau Claire, the Eau Claire City Council, and the community at large.

History
The land for the park was donated to the city of Eau Claire in 1909 by Henry Cleveland Putnam. The 230-acre parcel was set in a low-lying area, which Putnam hoped would be conserved as a botanical laboratory due to the many species of trees and plants found there. In 1957, ownership of the land was transferred from the city to Wisconsin State College at Eau Claire, under the administration of W. R. Davies.

Flora and fauna
The park is mostly forested, especially in the areas closest to the Chippewa River. Impressive red pine and white pine trees dominate the mesic forest portions, while in the wet-mesic portions, river birch, silver maple, hackberry, red maple and paper birch varieties can be found.

Putnam Park is also a common place to see wildlife. Despite being located in an otherwise urban setting, visitors have often described seeing large mammals like deer, woodchucks, and beavers. The park also offers opportunities for birdwatching, with species like hawks, wild turkeys, woodpeckers and eagles being sighted regularly.

Recreation
Putnam Park is a haven for walkers, runners, bikers, birdwatchers or nature-enthusiasts. There are many trails found throughout the park for walkers or runners. Sections of the park may also be accessed by car, though cars may traverse the road section (called Putnam Drive) of the trail by starting at the base of the hill on Garfield Avenue at the University of Wisconsin–Eau Claire. Cars may also access a small parking lot from the eastern side of the Third Ward on Putnam Drive, but are forbidden from driving east to west as the road is one-way. Putnam Drive is a popular spot for runners and is included in a section of the full race in the Eau Claire Marathon.

References

Eau Claire, Wisconsin
Parks in Wisconsin
Protected areas of Eau Claire County, Wisconsin
University of Wisconsin–Eau Claire
Protected areas established in 1909
1909 establishments in Wisconsin